Karl Heinrich Eduard von Hänisch (25 April 1861 – 27 March 1921), was a Prussian general who served in World War I, his military service spanned 37 years.

References 

1861 births
1921 deaths
Generals of Infantry (Prussia)
German Army generals of World War I
Recipients of the Iron Cross (1914), 1st class
Recipients of the Iron Cross (1914), 2nd class